The Deadliest Lies: The Israel Lobby and the Myth of Jewish Control (2007) is a book written by Abraham Foxman, the national director of the Anti-Defamation League.

See also
 Jewish lobby
 Israel lobby in the United States
 The Israel Lobby and U.S. Foreign Policy

References

External links 

 "The Deadliest Lies: The Israel Lobby and the Myth of Jewish Control". Publishers Weekly. June 11, 2007. Retrieved August 12, 2022.

2007 non-fiction books